Sadar Bazar railway station is a small railway station in Sadar Bazar which is a residential and commercial neighbourhood of Delhi. Its code is DSB. The station is part of Delhi Suburban Railway. The station consist of 4 platforms.

Major trains

 Udyan Abha Toofan Express
 Old Delhi–Agra Cantt. Passenger
 Panipat–New Delhi MEMU
 Panipat–Ghaziabad MEMU
 Rohtak–Hazrat Nizamuddin Passenger
 New Delhi–Kurukshetra MEMU
 Saharanpur–Delhi Passenger
 Bulandshahr–Tilak Bridge Passenger
 Kurukshetra–Hazrat Nizamuddin MEMU
 Merrut Cantt.–Rewari Jn. Passenger (via New Delhi)
 Sirsa Express

See also

 Hazrat Nizamuddin railway station
 New Delhi railway station
 Delhi Junction Railway station
 Anand Vihar Terminal railway station
 Sarai Rohilla railway station
 Delhi Metro

References

External links

Railway stations in North Delhi district
Delhi railway division